James Robert Payne (born 17 April 1970) is an English professional golfer.

Payne was born in Louth, Lincolnshire. He had a promising career as a tournament golfer which petered out by his early thirties, partly due to injury problems which had required him to undergo a spinal fusion operation at the age of 24. As an amateur he won the 1991 European Amateur and the British Youths Open Amateur Championship. He played with Jack Nicklaus in the final round of the 1991 Open Championship at Royal Birkdale and finished as leading amateur. He turned professional after playing in the Walker Cup later that year.

In 1992 Payne was Rookie of the Year on the European Tour. He won two European Tour events, the 1993 Turespana Iberia Open de Baleares and the 1996 Italian Open. His last season on the European Tour was 2000. In 2003 he took a position as club professional at Southport and Ainsdale Golf Club, a two time venue of the Ryder Cup.

Amateur wins
1986 McGregor Trophy
1987 McGregor Trophy
1991 European Amateur, British Youths Open Amateur Championship

Professional wins (3)

European Tour wins (2)

European Tour playoff record (1–0)

Other wins (1)
2000 Northern Open

Results in major championships

Note: Payne only played in The Open Championship.

LA = Low amateur
CUT = missed the half-way cut
"T" = tied

Team appearances
Amateur
Jacques Léglise Trophy (representing Great Britain & Ireland): 1987 (winners)
St Andrews Trophy (representing Great Britain & Ireland): 1990 (winners)
Walker Cup (representing Great Britain & Ireland): 1991
European Amateur Team Championship (representing England): 1991 (winners), 1993

Professional
World Cup (representing England): 1996

References

External links

English male golfers
European Tour golfers
People from Louth, Lincolnshire
1970 births
Living people